Gladys del Valle Requena (9 November 1952) is a Venezuelan politician who has been a member of the National Assembly and minister. She was also a member of the 2017 Constituent National Assembly.

Career
Requena moved to Vargas with her family looking for a better quality of life. She is a professor of Spanish and literature who graduated from the Instituto Pedagógico de Caracas in 1977, and graduated as a lawyer from the Central University of Venezuela in 1982. She specialized in labor law.

She was deputy to the National Assembly for the Vargas State and the president of the parliamentary Permanent Commission of Culture and Recreation. She is also one of the founders of the Regional Institute for Women in Vargas (IREMUJER) and the Women Network in Vargas in 1997, as well as member of the organizing commission of the Unitary Platform of Revolutionary Women in 2007 and the national commission for the conformation of the National Women Front in 2009.

Requena has been a delegate in several conferences for the Women's International Democratic Federation (WIDF), such as the São Paulo Forum summit in Caracas, 2012, the WIDF Direction Committee in Brussels, 2009 and the Fifth WIDF Regional Conference in Ecuador, 2009. From 2011 to 2014 she was the National Assembly delegate to the Inter-Parliamentary Union in six summits in Panama City, Bern, Kampala, Quebec City and Geneva. She is currently a member of the 2017 Constituent National Assembly.

Honors
 June 27 Second Class Order. Education Ministry. 1997.
 Venezuelan Heroines Order. Republic's presidency. 2009.
 Arminio Borjas Single Class Order. Lawyers College Federation. 2009.

References

1952 births
Living people
People from Sucre (state)
United Socialist Party of Venezuela politicians
Women government ministers of Venezuela
Members of the National Assembly (Venezuela)
21st-century Venezuelan women politicians
21st-century Venezuelan politicians
Central University of Venezuela alumni
People of the Crisis in Venezuela
Members of the Venezuelan Constituent Assembly of 2017